Sujith Vaassudev is an Indian cinematographer and film director who works predominantly in Malayalam films. He has also worked in several Tamil and Telugu films. He is best known for his works in Memories (2013), 7th Day (2014), Drishyam (2014) and Lucifer (2019). He was the recipient of the Kerala State Film Award for Best Cinematographer in 2013.

Career
Started his career as camera assistant in a studio called Sangeetha Vision in Trivandrum. From there he gradually build his knowledge in cinematography by assisting many cameramen.
He started his first independent works for television on 1998.
He has done more than 1000 episodes for television for various Malayalam channels. 
He assisted Raja Rathinam for a while in cinematography.
Sujith made his debut with  Chekavar a 2010 Malayalam film. His best works include Drishyam, 7th Day, Memories, Ayaal, Anarkali.

Sujith Vaassudev had won the 2013 Kerala State Film Award for Best Cinematography for the films Ayaal and Memories.

In 2016 he debuted as a director through the film James & Alice starring Prithviraj Sukumaran and Vedhika.

Personal life

Sujith married actress Manju Pillai on 23 December 2000. The couple has a daughter Daya Sujith.

Filmography

As Cinematographer

As director

As actor

Awards

References

External links
 

Living people
Malayalam film cinematographers
21st-century Indian photographers
Malayalam film directors
Male actors in Malayalam cinema
Artists from Thiruvananthapuram
Cinematographers from Kerala
1973 births